is the seventh single by Japanese band Antic Cafe. The single is featured on the Shikisai Moment album.  The song peaked at No. 63 on the Japanese singles chart.

Track listing
 "Merrymaking" (メリメイキング) - 5:03

References

An Cafe songs
2005 singles
2005 songs
Songs written by Kanon (bassist)
Loop Ash Records singles